Igor Erhartić (Serbian Cyrillic: Игор Ерхартић) (born January 29, 1984 in Novi Sad, SR Serbia, SFR Yugoslavia) is a Serbian swimmer. 

Erhartić represented Serbia and Montenegro at the 2004 Summer Olympics. He participated in one single event - the Men's 200 metre freestyle, in which he took 48th place overall among 59 competitors with a time of 1:54.21.

References
Biography and olympic results

1984 births
Living people
Serbian male freestyle swimmers
Swimmers at the 2004 Summer Olympics
Sportspeople from Novi Sad
Olympic swimmers of Serbia and Montenegro